Francisco José Nicolás "Nico" González (born 6 November 1988), commonly known as just Nico, is a Spanish footballer who plays for Racing Murcia FC as a winger.

Club career
Born in Molina de Segura, Murcia, Nico graduated from Villarreal CF's youth system, but made his senior debuts with Cádiz CF B in the 2007–08 season, in the Tercera División. One year later he joined Albacete Balompié, initially being assigned to the reserves in the same division; he played his first game as a professional on 26 October 2008, coming on as a late substitute in a 1–1 home draw against Celta de Vigo in the Segunda División.

In 2009, Nico first arrived in the Segunda División B, signing with Real Murcia Imperial. He continued competing in that level in the following years, with CD Guadalajara and CD Tenerife, contributing with four goals in 1,841 minutes of action to help the former club promote in 2011.

After Tenerife manager Antonio Calderón was sacked in January 2012, Nico was loaned to former side Guadalajara. On 3 March he scored his first professional goal, the last in a 2–0 win at FC Cartagena.

In June, Nico returned to Tenerife and division three and, despite being shown the door, he still managed to appear in 15 matches and net once during the season for the Canary Islands team, albeit in only one start. On 29 July 2013, his contract with the Blanquiazules was mutually terminated and he signed with Salamanca AC on 9 August. However, due to the club's juridical issues, he moved to Ontinyent CF instead.

On 8 July 2014, after suffering relegation with the Valencians, Nico moved to La Hoya Lorca CF also in the third division. Roughly a year later, he joined fellow league team Arandina CF.

On 13 July 2020, Nico joined Racing Murcia FC.

References

External links

1988 births
Living people
Spanish footballers
Footballers from the Region of Murcia
Association football wingers
Segunda División players
Segunda División B players
Tercera División players
Cádiz CF B players
Atlético Albacete players
Albacete Balompié players
Real Murcia Imperial players
CD Guadalajara (Spain) footballers
CD Tenerife players
Ontinyent CF players
Lorca FC players
Arandina CF players
Orihuela CF players